Club Deportivo Técnico Universitario is an Ecuadorian football club based in Ambato, Ecuador. It was founded on March 26 of 1971. Their city rivals are Macará. Were twice runners-up in Serie A of Ecuador in 1978 and 1980. They play in estadio Bellavista with a capacity of 16,467.

Present
On November 25, 2011 the club crowned its great season getting promotion to the top flight as Serie B champions, winning 2–0 at home to Atlético Audaz, Orense squad failed because of administrative problems the club was suspended by FEF.

Honors
Serie A
Runner-up (2): 1978, 1980
Serie B
Winner (6): 1977 E2, 1981 E2, 1999, 2002, 2011, 2017
Runner-up (1): 1995

Current squad
As of 5 March 2022.

Managers
 Jorge Célico (March 30, 2009 - December 31, 2009)
 Juan Urquiza (January 1, 2010 - April 3, 2010)
 Geovanny Mera (April 3, 2010 - August 18, 2010)
 Paúl Vélez (August 19, 2010 – November 28, 2011)
 Fabián Bustos (November 28, 2011 - April 13, 2012)
 Mario Saralegui (April 13, 2012 – June 18, 2012)
 Boris Fiallos (Interim) (June 19, 2012 - July 1, 2012)
 José Basualdo (July 1, 2012 – May 6, 2013)
 Homero Mistral Valencia (May 6, 2013 - July 2, 2013)
 Paúl Vélez (July 7, 2013 - December 2, 2014)
 Carlos Calderón (January 1, 2015 - May 25, 2015)
 Jorge Alfonso (May 26, 2015 - July 12, 2015)
 Boris Fiallos (Interim) (July 12, 2015 - July 20, 2015)
 Óscar del Solar (July 20, 2015 - September 6, 2015)
 Boris Fiallos (Interim) (September 7, 2015 - December 31, 2015)
 Geovanny Mera (January 13, 2016 – June 22, 2016)
 Jorge Ivan Vareles (Interim) (June 25, 2016 - September 5, 2016)
 Patricio Hurtado (September 5, 2016 - July 24, 2018)
 Fabián Frías (July 27, 2018 - April 30, 2019)
 José Hernández (May 1, 2019 - May 9, 2022)
 Juan Urquiza (May 9, 2022 -

References

External links
 Official website

Football clubs in Ecuador
Association football clubs established in 1971
1971 establishments in Ecuador
Ambato, Ecuador